Mumtaz Ali Shah is a retired Pakistani civil servant who served in BPS-22 grade as the Maritime Secretary of Pakistan and Chief Secretary Sindh. Hailing from Sindh, Shah joined the Pakistan Administrative Service after passing the Central Superior Service examination in 1984.

Career 
Mumtaz Ali Shah has served on important positions including as Federal Secretary for Maritime Affairs, Federal Secretary for Religious Affairs and as Chief Secretary Sindh.

Prior to his elevation to Grade 22 in 2017, Shah served on many positions in the Government of Sindh. Positions he held in Sindh include Additional Chief Secretary (Home), Chairman Enquiries & Anti-Corruption Establishment, Secretary Works and Services, Secretary Information Department, Secretary General Administration and Secretary Population Welfare.

In the beginning of his career, he served as assistant commissioner Multan and Dera Ghazi Khan in Punjab.

He has also previously served as District Coordinating Officer (DCO) for Badin, Mirpurkhas and Nasirabad in Balochistan.

References 

Living people
Pakistani civil servants
Pakistani government officials
Sindhi people
Year of birth missing (living people)